The Pepin County Courthouse and Jail is located in Durand, Wisconsin. In 1982, the site was added to the National Register of Historic Places. Additionally, it is listed on the Wisconsin State Register of Historic Places.

Use

The courthouse was constructed from 1873 to 1874 at a cost of $7,000, with the jail built next door. Attached to the jail was the official residence of the Sheriff of Pepin County, Wisconsin. In 1881, the site managed to survive a fire that cause great damage to the town. The jail and sheriff's residence remained in use until 1984, while the courthouse remained in use until 1985.

Old Courthouse Museum & Jail
Currently, the property serves as the Old Courthouse Museum & Jail, which is operated by the Pepin County Historical Society. Exhibits include the courtroom, jail, and displays of local history and culture.

1881 hanging incident
In 1881, a man who had been associated with Quantrill's Raiders and the James-Younger Gang was arrested in Durand for the murder of a sheriff's deputy. On the day of his trial at the courthouse, a mob descended upon the area, taking custody of the man and later hanging him.

The event was reported in the St. Paul Pioneer Press and The New York Times, causing Durand to gain a reputation of a "hanging town". However, it was later reported that most individuals involved in the hanging had come to the town from other areas. It was the last hanging in Wisconsin.

References

External links

 Old Courthouse Museum & Jail - official site

Museums in Pepin County, Wisconsin
Courthouses on the National Register of Historic Places in Wisconsin
Jails on the National Register of Historic Places in Wisconsin
Greek Revival architecture in Wisconsin
Government buildings completed in 1874
History museums in Wisconsin
Prison museums in the United States
National Register of Historic Places in Pepin County, Wisconsin
County courthouses in Wisconsin
Jails in Wisconsin